Wiesław Dziadura (born 20 October 1956) is a Polish wrestler. He competed in the men's Greco-Roman 74 kg at the 1980 Summer Olympics.

References

1956 births
Living people
Polish male sport wrestlers
Olympic wrestlers of Poland
Wrestlers at the 1980 Summer Olympics
Sportspeople from Gdańsk